Brille Records is an independent record label based in the UK, which has released work from bands including Whirlwind Heat, Good Shoes, Envelopes, Operator Please, The Bridge Gang, The Golden Filter, Gwilym Gold, Amateur Best, Casimer&Casimir and The Knife. It was in partnership with EMI Records UK from August 2005 until February 2008. Since 2011 it has been a part of the Cooperative Music group of labels. It is also a sister company to Dummy music website and music publisher Psychotic Reaction Music. It was started in 2004 by Leo Silverman, who was previously Head of A&R at XL Recordings and also created Rex Records.

Releases

Albums

See also
 List of record labels

External links
Official site
Official MySpace
Drowned in Sound profile

British independent record labels
Indie rock record labels
Alternative rock record labels